Edward "Ned" Hastings (born August 26, 1966), is an American video editor, producer and voice actor, best known for his work on various Adult Swim shows, most notably "Aqua Teen Hunger Force".  He has sometimes been credited as "Edward Hastings".

His first association with Cartoon Network was as an editor for "Space Ghost Coast to Coast" two years before the inception of Adult Swim.  The first episode he worked on was called "My Dinner with Steven", which was to feature comedian Steven Wright, but which was never completed.  Later, he edited "Fire Ant" which featured Conan O'Brien.

He edited the dialogue and audio for the earliest version of "Rabbot", the original pilot of "Aqua Teen Hunger Force".  After that show was given the greenlight to create its first season, Hastings came back to Williams Street Studios to edit more episodes of the Space Ghost show.  His first work for Aqua Teen was as the dialogue editor for "Mayhem of the Mooninites".  He became a regular episode editor in the second season, starting with the episode "Ol' Drippy".  Eventually, he was made a producer of the series, along with fellow editor Jay Wade Edwards and the show's creators Dave Willis and Matt Maiellaro. He voiced himself on the episode Super Trivia.

He has also edited dialogue for "Sealab 2021" and "Frisky Dingo" for 70/30 Productions, and he worked as an editor for six of the first seven episodes of "Squidbillies".

As a voice actor, he has appeared in "Aqua Teen Hunger Force" several times, in "Sealab 2021", "Squidbillies", "The Brak Show", "Frisky Dingo", and "Perfect Hair Forever".

Filmography

Television

References

External links
 

1966 births
Living people
American male voice actors
Male actors from Atlanta
American television producers